The second Nations Cup tournament was played at Appleby College, Oakville, Canada, in August 2009. An Under-20 version also took place in England a month before. The second tournament again included Canada, England and the USA, but these nations were joined by France for the first time.

Under 20 Nations Cup 2009 (Brunel University, London)

Final table

Points scoring
4 points awarded for a win, 2 points for a draw, no points for a loss. 1 bonus point awarded for scoring four or more tries and 1 bonus point for losing by less than 7 points.

Results

Third place

Final

Nations Cup 2009 (Appleby College, Oakville, Canada)

Final table

Results

See also
Women's international rugby

External links
U20 Nations Cup website

2009
International women's rugby union competitions hosted by Canada
International women's rugby union competitions hosted by England
2009 rugby union tournaments for national teams
2009 in Canadian rugby union
2009 in South African rugby union
2009 in American rugby union
2008–09 in English rugby union
2008–09 in Welsh rugby union
2008–09 in French rugby union
2009 in women's rugby union
rugby union
rugby union
rugby union
rugby union
Nations Cup
Nations Cup
Nations Cup